Ivan Aleksandrovich Gertlein (Russian: Иван Александрович Гертлейн; born 25 September 1987) is a Russian pole vaulter. He competed at the 2015 World Championships in Beijing advancing to the final where he no-heighted.

His personal bests in the event are 5.70 metres outdoors (Beijing 2015) and 5.50 metres indoors (Chelyabinsk 2011).

In October 2012 he tested positive for an anabolic steroid, testosterone, and received a two-year ban which lasted until October 2014.

International competitions

See also
 Russia at the 2015 World Championships in Athletics
 Doping cases in athletics

References

Russian male pole vaulters
Living people
Place of birth missing (living people)
1987 births
World Athletics Championships athletes for Russia
Doping cases in athletics
Russian sportspeople in doping cases